Buskerud-Arbeideren was a Norwegian newspaper, published in Buskerud county.

Buskerud-Arbeideren was started on 5 December 1923 as the Communist Party organ in the county. It was published daily. However, the party struggled economically and the newspaper went defunct after its last issue on 13 February 1925.

References

1923 establishments in Norway
1925 disestablishments in Norway
Mass media in Buskerud
Communist Party of Norway newspapers
Defunct newspapers published in Norway
Norwegian-language newspapers
Newspapers established in 1923
Publications disestablished in 1925